In system software, a job queue ( batch queue, input queue), is a data structure maintained by job scheduler software containing jobs to run.

Users submit their programs that they want executed, "jobs", to the queue for batch processing. 
The scheduler software maintains the queue as the pool of jobs available for it to run. 

Multiple batch queues might be used by the scheduler to differentiate types of jobs 
depending on parameters such as:
 job priority
 estimated execution time
 resource requirements  

The use of a batch queue gives these benefits:
 sharing of computer resources among many users
 time-shifts job processing to when the computer is less busy
 avoids idling the compute resources without minute-by-minute human supervision
 allows around-the-clock high utilization of expensive computing resources

Any process that comes to the CPU should wait in a queue.

See also
Command pattern
Command queue
Job scheduler 
Priority queue
Task queue

Job scheduling